The 1983 Atlantic 10 men's basketball tournament was the seventh held by the Atlantic 10 Conference, and the first under the conference's current name. It was held in Philadelphia at The Spectrum from March 7–12, 1983. West Virginia defeated Temple 86-78 to win their first tournament championship. Terence Stansbury of Temple was named the Most Outstanding Player of the tournament.

Bracket

External links
  Atlantic 10 Men's Basketball Tournament History 

Atlantic 10 men's basketball tournament
Tournament
Atlantic 10 men's basketball tournament
Atlantic 10 men's basketball tournament
Basketball in Philadelphia